Dichomeris flavocostella, the cream-edged dichomeris moth, is a moth in the family Gelechiidae. It was described by James Brackenridge Clemens in 1860. It is found in North America, where it has been recorded from southern Quebec and Maine to Florida, west to Texas and north to Manitoba.

The wingspan is 15–18 mm. The forewings are purplish black with a cream-colored strip along the costa to the apex. A spur of this strip points inward in the postmedian area. The hindwings are gray. Adults are on wing from May to August.

The larvae feed on Solidago and Aster species.

References

Moths described in 1860
flavocostella